Joe Vide (born May 16, 1984 in Fort Worth, Texas) is an American soccer player.

Career

Amateur
Vide attended high school while playing for TSV Munich 1860's youth team in Munich, Germany. He played four years at the University of Virginia as a defensive midfielder and became a regular for the Cavaliers by his senior year.  In 2004, he spent the collegiate off season with the Richmond Kickers Future in the USL Premier Development League.

Professional
Vide was selected fifth overall in the 2006 MLS Supplemental Draft by MetroStars. He made his MLS debut July 4, 2006 as a substitute against Los Angeles Galaxy. He would go on to appear in 7 matches for the re-branded New York Red Bulls during the season, including two starts.

After not featuring in the clubs plans during the early part of the 2007 campaign, Vide began to receive significant playing time earning 16 appearances and 13 starts due to injuries to first team midfielders Claudio Reyna and Dema Kovalenko. He also made his playoff debut against New England Revolution on November 3, playing 77 minutes. His tenacious play and ability on the ball in the center of the field was a revelation and quickly established Vide as a fan favorite.

On November 21, 2007, he was selected by San Jose Earthquakes in the 2007 MLS Expansion Draft. He was waived on July 14, 2008.

On July 16, 2008, he was claimed by D.C. United. He scored his first MLS goal for United against Colorado on August 23. Despite solid performances for D.C., he was waived by the club in February 2009.

Personal life
In April 2010, Joe Vide was diagnosed with Stage 3 Hodgkin's Lymphoma.

Honors
Elected to the Capital Area Soccer League (CASL) Hall of Fame in 2012

D.C. United
Lamar Hunt U.S. Open Cup (1): 2008

References

1984 births
Living people
American soccer players
New York Red Bulls players
Richmond Kickers Future players
San Jose Earthquakes players
D.C. United players
People from Fort Worth, Texas
TSV 1860 Munich II players
Virginia Cavaliers men's soccer players
USL League Two players
Major League Soccer players
New York Red Bulls draft picks
Soccer players from Texas
Association football midfielders
American expatriate soccer players in Germany
Expatriate footballers in Germany
American expatriate soccer players